Nikolas Schreck is an American singer-songwriter, musician, author, film-maker and Tantric Buddhist religious teacher based in Berlin, Germany.

Now a solo artist, Schreck founded the musical magical recording and performance collective Radio Werewolf, which operated from 1984-1994, releasing seven albums. Schreck was also the lead singer of the musical duo Kingdom of Heaven whose album, XXIII, was released in April 2015. He collaborated musically with his former wife, American singer and musician Zeena Schreck, as well as Australian percussionist John Murphy, NON, Death in June, and the British actor Christopher Lee, whose first album Schreck conceived and produced.

As a solo artist, his song "Lord Sutekh's Dream" was released by German record label The Epicurean in conjunction with Schreck's May 28, 2016 concert at the Epicurean Escapism Festival in Berlin.

Since that concert, Schreck has recorded and performed with his band consisting of Winfried Strauss (keyboards), Ohnesorg (bass), and Heathen Rae (drums and percussion.) After a performance at Wave-Gotik-Treffen in Leipzig, noted as one of the best concerts at the WGT by German music site der Schwarze Welt, Schreck and his band released the vinyl EP The Futura Model on The Epicurean label. A monthly radio program, The Nikolas Schreck Show, premiered on Berlin's Radio on October 31, 2017.

Schreck's album The Illusionist was released by US label Records Ad Nauseam at an event held at Zebulon in Los Angeles on August 10, 2019.

His books include The Manson File: Myth and Reality of an Outlaw Shaman (2011); Demons of the Flesh: The Complete Guide to Left Hand Path Sex Magic (2002), co-authored with Zeena; Flowers from Hell: A Satanic Reader (2001); The Satanic Screen: An Illustrated Guide to the Devil in Cinema, (2001); and the first edition of The Manson File (1988).

His film appearances include the 1989 documentary, Charles Manson Superstar, which he directed; Usher, the last film of Curtis Harrington; and Mortuary Academy. He teaches Tantric Buddhist meditation.

Career
Schreck was the founder, frontman, and sole constant member of the magical musical collective Radio Werewolf from 1984–1993, whose recordings include The Fiery Summons (1989); The Lightning and the Sun (1989); Bring Me the Head of Geraldo Rivera! A Benediction in Four Movements (1990); Songs for the End of the World (1991); Witchcraft/Boots: A Tribute to the Sinatras (1991), Love Conquers All (1992); and 2012's compilation The Vinyl Solution.

Schreck was a prominent practitioner of black magic who co-led the magical school, The Werewolf Order, with his then-wife Zeena from 1988-1999. He worked closely in the late 1980s with Church of Satan founder Anton LaVey (Zeena's father), publicly speaking in support for the Church, although he was not a member. When his wife Zeena renounced Satanism, he followed suit. Schreck was a Master of the Temple of Set before resigning with several others in 2002 due to religious and administrative differences. In 2002, Schreck was one of the founding members of the Sethian Liberation Movement (formerly the Storm) which is currently located in Berlin. In 2003 he converted to Tantric Buddhism.

Schreck is the author of The Manson File: Myth and Reality of an Outlaw Shaman (2011) Demons of the Flesh: The Complete Guide to Left Hand Path Sex Magic, (2002) co-authored with Zeena, Flowers from Hell: A Satanic Reader (2001), The Satanic Screen: An Illustrated Guide to the Devil in Cinema, (2001) and the first edition of The Manson File (1988).

In 1997, Schreck produced the first full-length album by British actor Christopher Lee Christopher Lee Sings Devils, Rogues & Other Villains which was released on Schreck's Wolfslair label.

Schreck's series of novels The Dallas Book of the Dead was previewed in a reading broadcast on NPR's Berlin Stories in July, 2013. He directed the documentary Charles Manson Superstar. a.

On January 17, 2018, Schreck delivered a LDN lecture in London entitled The Charles Manson Conspiracy.

Music

Kingdom of Heaven
In 2012, Nikolas Schreck (vocalist/lyricist) and James Collord (bassist/multi-instrumentalist) founded their musical collaboration Kingdom of Heaven (KOH) whose songs In Dreamland and Midnight in Cairo were premiered on a Nightwatch Radio interview in November 2013.

Kingdom of Heaven's first single "The Ballad of Lurleen Tyler" was made available via iTunes in December 2013, followed in March 2014 by a video for the song on the Kingdom of Heaven YouTube channel.

In May 2014, Nikolas Schreck was interviewed on the Green Tea Berlin radio program broadcast by Alex Radio and 88.4 Berlin, which featured the European radio premiere of Kingdom of Heaven's song "Enemy on Both Sides", which Schreck introduced as the 'theme to a non-existent James Bond movie'.

In March 2015, Schreck's Facebook page announced that Kingdom of Heaven would perform a concert at the Wave-Gotik-Treffen music festival in Leipzig Germany on May 22, 2015.

He has since then recorded and performed with his band consisting of Winfried Strauss (keyboards), Ohnesorg (bass) and Heathen Rae (drums and percussion) with whom he recorded the vinyl EP The Futura Model, released in October 2017. His album The Illusionist, featuring the same band, was released in 2019 by Recorda Ad Nauseam.

Radio Werewolf

Schreck founded the band Radio Werewolf in 1984. His theatrical ritual performances as the group's lead singer, billed as Rallies of the Radio Werewolf Youth Party, provoked controversy, as did provocative appearances on several television programs. Tension over the contentious nature of the band's music led to the departure of co-founder Evil Wilhelm from Radio Werewolf shortly after their participation in the notorious 8-8-88 Rally in San Francisco. Although there was hostility during the breakup, the band members later reconciled. Schreck's 1989 LP The Fiery Summons was the first Radio Werewolf album, although the previous formation recorded a still unreleased album in 1987.

Key to the bands beliefs about themselves was the existence of what they termed the "dominant frequency" or "alpha frequency." Schreck explained the band by saying "Radio Werewolf is a sound, a vibration, a certain frequency from another world. I just transmitted it. The bodies and minds of all the people who tuned into that frequency were the mediums that broadcast came through on. I only get credit for ”creating” it because I have a big mouth, I was in the front of the stage, and I was the one the media paid the most attention to."

Zeena Schreck served as Radio Werewolf co-director from 1988-1993, the group's most prolific period, which saw the release of their recordings Songs for the End of the World, The Lightning and the Sun, Bring Me the Head of Geraldo Rivera!, Witchcraft-Boots: A Tribute to the Sinatras  and Love Conquers All.

In 2012, Radio Werewolf's The Vinyl Solution - Analog Artifacts, Ritual Instrumentals and Undercover Versions was released by World Operations. The compact disc, the first official Radio Werewolf release since 1992, compiles newly remastered re-releases of 12 ambient sonic magic tracks from Zeena and Nikolas Schreck's rare Radio Werewolf vinyl recordings between 1989-1992 as well as 2 bonus tracks never previously released to the public.

Video Werewolf
Schreck's 1989 documentary, Charles Manson Superstar, told the story of Charles Manson's life as well as interviewing him in San Quentin Prison. The documentary featured parts of an originally hour and a half long interview of Manson, as well as many photographs and video footage, of the Manson Family, Spahn Ranch, and other related topics. Also discussed were Manson's alleged ties to Nazi movements (which he denied) and to various Satanic movements. Other Video Werewolf releases include The Zurich Experiment, which documented Radio Werewolf's last public concert.

Writings

The Manson File
Schreck's The Manson File (1988) is a study of the philosophy, music and spiritual ideas of Charles Manson. The book discusses Manson's ATWA ecology concept and his religious devotion to the Gnostic god Abraxas. Schreck posited that the demonization of Manson (and perhaps the martyrdom of Manson by other groups) is the result of media sensationalism.

In April 2011 a new expanded edition was released in France as Le Dossier Manson : Mythe Et Réalité D'un Chaman Hors-La-Loi (" The Manson File: Myth and Reality of an Outlaw Shaman"). Schreck argues that the "Helter Skelter" theory put forth by prosecuting attorney Vincent Bugliosi had little if anything to do with the reality of the crimes. According to Schreck, the murders of Sharon Tate and the others actually resulted from conventional underworld rivalries between drug dealer associates Charles Watson and Jay Sebring, who Schreck contends was linked to the Mafia.

A mass market English edition was published in December 2011.  Metal Impact praised The Manson File for its comprehensive view of the subject, and for taking an academic stance.

Other works

In 2001 and 2002, Schreck wrote or co-wrote three books published by Creation Books.

Schreck's Flowers From Hell: A Satanic Reader was released in 2001. The book detailed the history of the use of Satan as a symbol, archetype, and deity in fiction across different cultures and time periods.

The Satanic Screen: An Illustrated Guide to the Devil in Cinema was also released in 2001. The book documents uses of the devil in film media throughout.

In Demons of the Flesh: The Complete Guide to Left Hand Path Sex Magic, released in 2002, Schreck and his then wife Zeena explored the theory, history and practice of erotic sorcery and worship of the feminine in world religion.

Works featured in
Schreck was interviewed for the book Mythos Wewelsburg: Fakten und Legenden, about his relation to the Wewelsburg castle.

References

External links 
 Nikolas Schreck's official
 Bandcamp Nikolas Schreck
 

American rock singers
American male songwriters
Left-Hand Path
Setians
Goth subculture
Place of birth missing (living people)
Former Satanists
Tibetan Buddhists from the United States
Converts to Buddhism
American Buddhists
Living people
Year of birth missing (living people)
American male writers
American people of German descent